The 2018–19 season was Unione Sportiva Città di Palermo's 2nd consecutive season in Serie B, the second-highest division of Italian football. By the end of the 2018–19 Serie B, Palermo were originally the third-placed team with 63 points, but were relegated to Serie D because the club failed to register in Serie B for financial issues.

Players

Squad information
Players and squad numbers last updated on 1 March 2019.Appearances and goals are counted for domestic leagues (Serie A and Serie B) and national cup (Coppa Italia) and correct as of 11 May 2019.Note: Flags indicate national team as has been defined under FIFA eligibility rules. Players may hold more than one non-FIFA nationality.

Transfers

Pre-summer transfers

Summer 2018

In

Out

Other acquisitions

Other disposals

Post-summer transfers

Other post-summer disposals

Pre-winter transfers

Other pre-winter disposals

Winter 2019

Out

Other acquisitions

Other disposals

Post-winter transfers

Total expenditure: €2,000,000

Total revenue: €16,000,000

Net income: €14,000,000

Pre-season and friendlies

Competitions

Overall

Serie B

League table

Results summary

Results by round

Matches

Serie B

Coppa Italia

Appearances and goals

|-
! colspan=14 style=background:pink; text-align:center| Goalkeepers

|-
! colspan=14 style=background:pink; text-align:center| Defenders

|-
! colspan=14 style=background:pink; text-align:center| Midfielders

|-
! colspan=14 style=background:pink; text-align:center| Forwards

|}

Goalscorers

Clean sheets

Disciplinary record

Attendances

References

Palermo F.C. seasons
Palermo